YLR may refer to:

 Yale Law Journal, legal journal sometimes called the Yale Law Review 
 Leaf Rapids Airport
 Yaxham Light Railway
 the ISO 639 code for the Yalarnnga language